AMCO Batteries Limited is an automobile and commercial Battery manufacturing company headquartered in Chennai, Tamil Nadu. It is a part of Rs. 15,000-crore Amalgamations Group, one of India's biggest light engineering groups in India. Started in year 1932, today AMCO is the leading supplier of two-wheeler batteries to companies like Honda, Hero Motor Corp, Bajaj Auto, TVS, Yamaha, Royal Enfield, Mahindra Two Wheelers etc. It also supplies four-wheeler batteries to TAFE Tractors, Eicher Tractors, Sonalika Tractors etc. The product profile of AMCO includes Automotive, Inverter, Genset and UPS Batteries. It manufactures wide variety of batteries across all these product categories. AMCO is a market leader in two-wheeler battery segment with most of the two-wheelers coming with AMCO Battery's O.E, fitment. The company also manufactures four-wheeler Batteries with product range consisting of Factory Charged, Dry Charged and Maintenance Free batteries.

History 
AMCO was founded by Becken Bain, a German national. the company subsequently became part of Amalgamations Group in 1955. AMCO began operations under the stewardship of late S Anantharamakrishnan. The company saw exponential growth and expansion under the leadership of late Chairpersons, Dr. A. Sivasailam and Ms. Jayshree Venkataraman.

It was the leading automotive battery manufacturer in the country. AMCO was the trendsetter in introducing two-wheeler batteries in India and was the first company to launch two wheeler polypropylene batteries in year 1984–85. AMCO has got QS 9000:1998, ISO 9001, ISO 14001 and TS16949 certifications which were a proof of its quality and high standards.

Products 
AMCO manufactures products mainly in four ranges: Automobile Batteries, Inverter Batteries, UPS Batteries and Genset Batteries. Under Automobile Battery range AMCO manufactures Batteries for two-wheelers, Cars/SUVs/MUVs, Tractors and Commercial Vehicles.

Milestones 
1932
 Accumulator Manufacturing Company Pvt. Ltd is set up by Mr. Becken Bain, a German national
1955 
 Purchased by AMALGAMATIONS Group who infused fresh capital. Production commenced under the stewardship of late Mr. Anantharamakrishnan with late Mr. K.G. Parameswaran as M.D.
1964
 Signed technical collaboration with M/s. Gould Inc. The only battery company in to make all battery components in house including containers and rubber separators
 Commenced exports to Yugoslavia and USSR and became the largest battery exporter from India. AMCO was awarded status of Export House by the Government of India
 AMCO was First Indian Company to make Train Lighting Cells for Railways. This was the initial production
 In the late 1960s, the strategic shift to add automotive batteries in the product mix taken up
1971 
 Foundation laid for modern plant at Hebbal, Bangalore 
1974 
 On 1 January, commercial production commenced in Hebbal plant 
1976 
 Export Battery Division commenced at Hebbal plant for making traction batteries for USSR
1980 
 AMCO celebrates its Silver Jubilee and expands business to contract manufacturing for MNC brands like MICO, Crompton, etc.
1984   
 Collaboration with YUASA Corporation
 AMCO becomes the first battery company to supply batteries to all newer generation vehicles of Hero Honda Motors Ltd., Yamaha Motors India Pvt. Ltd, TVS Motor Company Ltd and Bajaj Auto Ltd.
1985–86
 AMCO adds Maruti Udyog Ltd. with supply of NS40 batteries. Market moves to Poly Propylene batteries and AMCO starts supplies of such batteries to OEMs including TAFE, Mahindra, TELCO, Ashok Leyland etc.
1992 
 Export markets become less attractive. AMCO  shifts focus to gain dominance of domestic market for automotive batteries 
1993 
 TAFE-Power Source Division is born, with manufacturing facility at Maraimalai Nagar to enable AMCO to sell more batteries 
1994–96
 AMCO took a decision to become an automotive battery company, returning to the Group's core competencies in the automotive sector
 First Battery Company in to get ISO 9001 certification in 1994. Today the company  has been certified for  ISO 14001, QS9000 and now TS16949, ensuring the highest quality parameters
2004  
 Parts ways with YUASA Corporation, to emerge with a greater resurgence, more dynamism and better products. OE fraternity grows to include Honda Motorcycle and Scooter India Ltd., LML, Kinetic Motors etc. in the Two-Wheeler segment. In the Four-Wheeler segment, VST Tillers Ltd, SAS Motors (Manufacturers of Angad Tractors), Cummins India Ltd, Toyota Kirloskar Motor Ltd became OE customers.
2005 onward 
 AMCO's Hebbal operations shifted to Mysore Road with a state of art battery line.  
 Undisputed leader in two wheeler market, two out of three new generation vehicles on the road have AMCO 
 Recipient of Vendor Awards from M/s. Honda Motorcycle & Scooter India Pvt Ltd., M/s. Hero Motocrop Ltd., M/s. Bajaj Auto Ltd, M/s.International Tractors Ltd., and M/s. Toyota Kirloskar Motor Pvt. Ltd.
 A large dealer network of over 1000 dealers spread all over India keeps the Brand AMCO alive and growing, enabling good sales. The after sales service support for OEMs is also provided by the same dealer fraternity in addition to supporting their own sales

Amalgamations Group 
Amalgamations Group, founded in year 1938 is an Indian business conglomerate based out of Chennai. The Group has companies operating across diverse industries. The Group has interest across Manufacturing, Plantations, Trading & Distribution and Services. It is among India's top Light Engineering Conglomerates. The group has 47 companies under its fold which operate 50 manufacturing plants. The most notable companies of group are Tractor and Farm Equipment Limited (Better known as TAFE), Simpsons & Company, T Stanes & Co, AMCO Batteries, Higginbotham's and Addisons Paints.

The group's history traces back to year 1935 when Mr. Sivasailam Anantharamakrishnan joined the Simpsons Group, a British-owned South Indian business conglomerate, as Secretary in 1935. In year 1938 he was the one of the three directors on the board when Simpsons formed a holding company. It was converted into a public limited company next year, which later became Amalgamations Group in 1941. During 1940s Anantharamakrishnan lead the rapid expansion of group, even though he became its Chairman only in year 1953.

The Amalgamations Group after acquiring 100-year-old Simpsons in 1941, started acquiring several prominent old companies of South India like Higginbotham's, Associated Printers, Associated Publishers, Addison & Co., SRVS, George Oakes, T.Stanes, The United Nilgiri Tea Estates and Stanes Amalgamated Estates. From 1950s onward the group's auto component manufacturing companies have supplied products to all the major OEM suppliers, helping them in reducing dependence on imports. The Group companies have formed several alliances with international partners to boost their technological capabilities. These alliances along with internal innovation, R & D and continuous zeal for New Product Development has led to group companies gaining good share in "After Sales Market" as well.

References

External links 
 Official Website

Artillery batteries
Motor vehicle battery manufacturers
Consumer battery manufacturers
Manufacturing companies based in Chennai
Indian brands
Indian companies established in 1932
Manufacturing companies established in 1932
Indian companies established in 1955